The Dobrovăț is a right tributary of the river Vaslui in Romania. It flows into the Vaslui near Codăești.

References

Rivers of Romania
Rivers of Iași County
Rivers of Vaslui County